Peter Malcolm Hilt (born 1942) is a former New Zealand politician.

Biography 

Hilt was born in Auckland, and attended Takapuna Grammar School. He was in the New Zealand Police for 18 years, becoming a Detective Sergeant.

He was an MP from 1990 to 1996, representing first the National Party and then United New Zealand. He was first elected to Parliament in the 1990 election, defeating Labour's Judy Keall in the Glenfield seat. In 1995, however, he left National to join the new United New Zealand Party, founded as a centrist group by seven sitting MPs. In the 1996 general election, he was not re-elected. He stood in the  electorate where he came fifth. He was ranked in 6th place on United's party list, but with the party receiving only 0.88% of the party vote, it did not qualify for any list MPs.

In the 44th New Zealand Parliament, Hilt was elected Deputy Chairman of Committees on 1 March 1995 after Joy McLauchlan resigned that position on 27 February. Hilt was the last to hold this role as it was disestablished on 21 February 1996. Though he had by this time left the National Party, Hilt continued in the succeeding position of first Assistant Speaker. , he remains the only presiding officer of the New Zealand House of Representatives since 1943 not to have been a member of either National or Labour while serving.

References 

1942 births
Living people
United New Zealand MPs
New Zealand National Party MPs
New Zealand MPs for Auckland electorates
People educated at Takapuna Grammar School
Unsuccessful candidates in the 1996 New Zealand general election
Members of the New Zealand House of Representatives
New Zealand police officers